Pennsylvania House of Representatives District 161 includes part of Delaware County. It is currently represented by Democrat Leanne Krueger.

District profile
The district includes the following areas:

Delaware County:

 Aston Township
 Brookhaven
 Chester Township
 Middletown Township (PART)
 District 01
 District 02 [PART, Divisions 01 and 02]
 Nether Providence Township
 Ridley (PART)
 Ward 01 [PART, Divisions 01 and 03]
 Ward 02
 Ward 05 [PART, Division 01]
 Ward 07
 Rose Valley
 Upland

Representatives

Recent election results

References

External links
 from the United States Census Bureau
Pennsylvania House Legislative District Maps from the Pennsylvania Redistricting Commission.  
Population Data for District 44 from the Pennsylvania Redistricting Commission.

Government of Delaware County, Pennsylvania
161